Fernando Pedroza (born 1964/1965) is a former mayor of Lynwood, California.

Biography
Pedroza moved to Lynwood in 1979 with his family. In 1984, he graduated from Lynwood High School and then graduated from Webster Career College in Long Beach. 

Pedroza was elected to the Lynwood City Council in November 2001 and was the city's mayor in 2003. On September 25, 2007, he was ousted from the City Council in a recall election which also resulted in the removal of mayor Louis Byrd and fellow council members Leticia Vasquez and Alfreddie Johnson Jr. Mayor Pro Tem Maria Teresa Santillan, the only council member to not face a recall vote, served as mayor in the interim.

Personal life
Pedroza is married to Diana Pedroza; they have two daughters.

References

Living people
Mayors of places in California
People from Lynwood, California
1960s births
Mayors of Lynwood, California
Hispanic and Latino American mayors in California
Hispanic and Latino American politicians